Windrider (alternatively worded as Wind Rider and also known as Making Waves) is a 1986 Australian romantic comedy film directed by Vincent Monton and starring Tom Burlinson, Nicole Kidman, and Bud Tingwell. It was filmed in Perth, Western Australia, Australia.

Plot
Stewart "P.C." Simpson (Burlinson) lives in a magnificent beachfront home, and is an enthusiastic windsurfer, indulging his passion for windsurfing on a daily basis. His wealthy father (Tingwell) may fault P.C.'s inconsistency in working within the company he owns, but can appreciate his son's remarkable abilities on the waves. With the help of his father's company's engineer Howard (Chilvers), P.C. develops a high tech sailboard for the coming world windsurfing championship. Meanwhile, Jade (Kidman) is a rock singer who starts a relationship with P.C., but as their romance blooms, sport, friends and the upcoming championship become secondary.

Cast
 Tom Burlinson as Stewart P.C. Simpson
 Nicole Kidman as Jade
 Bud Tingwell as Stewart Simpson Senior
 Jill Perryman as Miss Dodge
 Simon Chilvers as Howard
 Kim Bullard as Coyote
 Stig Wemyss as Ratso
 Mark Williams as Mangles
 Alastair Cummings as Rabbit
 Robin Miller as Wally
 Matt Parkinson as Lurch
 Lorraine Webster as Mud
 John Ryan as McBride
 Lance Karapetcoff as King
 Ric Whittle as Ross
 Penny Brown as Kate
 Alistair Browning as Cram

Production
The movie was the first film directed by experienced cinematographer Vince Monton. Monton later said he felt the film was too adult (it received an M rating) when it should have been aimed at 13-year olds.

In an interview, Kidman stated was attracted to the role of Jade because the character was older.

Filming started 16 September 1985.

Home media
Windrider was released on DVD by Umbrella Entertainment in March 2010. The DVD includes special features such as the theatrical trailer, Umbrella Entertainment trailers, a stills gallery, wind surfing promo, Young Thing music promo, Nicole Kidman music promo, an extended bedroom scene, script, press kit, press clippings and cast biographies.

See also
Cinema of Australia

References

External links

Windrider at the National Film and Sound Archive
Windrider at Oz Movies

1986 films
1980s sports drama films
1986 drama films
Australian sports drama films
Films set in Perth, Western Australia
Films shot in Perth, Western Australia
1980s English-language films